Messenger of the fullness of the Gospel is a Mormon fundamentalist publication, originally printed in Birmingham, England, starting in 1991, which was in print in that country until 2001, and continues as a web-based publication. It went under the original title of Truth Seeker magazine, until it was found that there was an existing periodical that shared that name.

Although originally printed quarterly, it was printed bi-monthly when it moved to an American-produced edition in 2003.

It was edited by a former bishop of the Church of Jesus Christ of Latter-day Saints (LDS Church), along with a member who worked for the LDS Church. It is unique in being the only such Mormon fundamentalist magazine printed outside of the United States, and probably the only one edited and authored by active LDS Church members (although they were subsequently excommunicated for their beliefs).  Their involvement in the magazine was possibly one of the factors that led to their excommunication from the LDS Church.

It was perhaps the first Mormon publication on the Internet, having first appeared online in 1994. However, Orson Scott Card's Vigor ezine was available in plain text on Compuserve before this.

This magazine is not, nor does it claim to be, an official publication of the LDS Church.

See also
 List of Latter Day Saint periodicals

References

 Nate Taylor (Editor), Messenger of the Fullness of the Gospel - Volumes 1 & 2, .

External links
 Messenger magazine
 Truth Sought and Found - articles from Truth Seeker magazine
 Internet Archived old sites: mormons.org.uk, gnat.org.uk, lineone.net, troubador.com (1998–1999), mormonmessenger.org (2006–2007), messenger.mormonfundamentalism.org (2004–2008)

1991 in Christianity
1991 establishments in the United Kingdom
2001 disestablishments in the United Kingdom
Bi-monthly magazines published in the United Kingdom
Christian magazines
Defunct magazines published in the United Kingdom
Latter Day Saint periodicals
Magazines disestablished in 2001
Magazines established in 1991
Mass media in Birmingham, West Midlands
Mormon fundamentalism
Quarterly magazines published in the United Kingdom
Religious magazines published in the United Kingdom